RMS Alaunia may refer to:

 , a British ocean liner launched in 1913 and sunk in 1916
 , a British ocean liner launched in 1925 and scrapped in 1957
 , a British cargo liner launched in 1960 

Ship names